The elm cultivar Ulmus 'Crispa Aurea' was first mentioned by Schelle & Beissner in 1903, as Ulmus montana crispa aurea.

Description
Schneider described it in 1904 as like 'Crispa' but with more or less golden leaves. Elwes and Henry (1913) described the leaves as "yellowish".

Pests and diseases
See under 'Crispa'.

Cultivation
No specimens are known to survive.

References

Wych elm cultivar
Ulmus articles missing images
Ulmus
Missing elm cultivars